Margarida Folc de Cardona i Requesens (1535–1581), was a Spanish court official. She was a lady-in-waiting to the Holy Roman Empress Maria of Habsburg between 1548 and 1581. She had an influential position in the court of the Empress, and her correspondence with her spouse and daughter Anna von Dietrichstein, gives valuable documentation about the politics of a royal household and its members.

Life
Margarida de Cardona was the daughter of the Spanish noble Antonio Folc de Cardona y Enriquez and Maria de Requesens (d. 1577). Margarida de Cardona was appointed maid of honour to princess Maria prior to her marriage to Maximilian. 

She accompanied Maria to Austria in 1551. She married the German diplomat and court official Adam von Dietrichstein in 1554. She had thirteen children. 
Her mother served as chief-lady-in-waiting to Maria in 1554-77, and Margarita de Cardona herself was appointed lady-in-waiting after her marriage to the chamberlain of Maximilian.   Margarita de Cardona and Adam von Dietrichstein, along with Maria de Lara and Wratislav von Pernstein, belonged to the intimate circle of strictly Catholic courtiers preferred by Maria in Austria.  

In 1563, Margarita left for Spain with her spouse, who had been appointed to serve as the governor of Maria's sons Rudolf and Ernst. In 1570, she was appointed to the task to organize the household of the new queen of Spain, Anna of Austria. Her daughters and her sisters were all ladies-in-waiting to Queen Anna of Spain and the Spanish princesses, and Margarita illustrate the influence a lady-in-waiting could have in affecting the appointments for court offices. 

In 1573, she returned to Austria and resumed her post as lady-in-waiting to Maria. Margarita de Cardona accompanied Maria back to Spain when Maria was widowed, and died in Spain.

References

 Nadine Akkerman: The Politics of Female Households: Ladies-In-Waiting Across Early Modern Europe (2013)

1535 births
1581 deaths
16th-century Spanish people
Spanish ladies-in-waiting
16th-century Spanish women